Cross Hill or Crosshill may refer to:

Places
Cross Hill, Cornwall, England
Cross Hill, Derbyshire, England
Cross Hill, Gloucestershire, England
Cross Hill, South Carolina, USA
Crosshill, East Ayrshire, Scotland
Crosshill, Fife, Scotland
Crosshill, Glasgow, Scotland
Crosshill, an area of Baillieston, Scotland
Crosshill, South Ayrshire, Scotland
Crosshill, Wellesley, Regional Municipality of Waterloo, Ontario, Canada

See also
Cross Hills
Hill of Crosses